Contra la Indecisión is a studio album by Swedish pianist Bobo Stenson which was released in January 2018 on the ECM label.

Reception

Allmusic awarded the album 4 stars with the review by Thom Jurek stating "Contra la Indecision is the first recording by Bobo Stenson's trio in six years ... The trio has matured greatly and they are more flexible, confident, and speculative ... As a whole, Contra la Indecision is more colorful, more varied, and brighter than anything the pianist has released this century, making it a welcome return".

All About Jazz reviewer Karl Ackermann said, "Stenson's own style is easily recognizable and is especially well-served in the company of Jormin and Fält. Not all of Stenson's work has the bursts of color that we hear in Contra La Indecision and that makes it one of his most interesting albums to date".

JazzTrail called it "another poetic work comprising ravishing originals", noting that by "Avoiding standards in his repertoire, Stenson displays the highly developed language that has been characterizing his cultivated playing throughout all these years. He also evinces a distinctive complicity with his trio mates, which obviously has positive repercussions in their sound. And how they seemed to have fun riding these sonic waves!"

In JazzTimes, Michael J. West wrote "Contra la Indecisión is scintillating, soothing … and soporific. It is not to be attempted without a cup of coffee. Its sleep charm overcome, however, pianist Bobo Stenson and his longtime trio (bassist Anders Jormin, drummer Jon Fält) offer soundscapes of atmospheric beauty and stunning interplay in its melodies and texture".

Track listing

Personnel
 Bobo Stenson — piano
Anders Jormin — bass
Jon Fält — drums

References

2018 albums
ECM Records albums
Bobo Stenson albums
Albums produced by Manfred Eicher